{{Infobox scientist
| name = Emil Leon Post
| image = Emil Leon Post.jpg
| birth_date = February 11, 1897
| birth_place = Augustów, Suwałki Governorate, Congress Poland, Russian Empire(now Poland)
| death_date = 
| death_place = New York City, U.S.
| residence = 
| nationality =
| field = Mathematics, logic
| work_institution = Princeton University
| alma_mater        = City College of New York (B.S., 1917)Columbia University (A.M. 1918, Ph.D. 1920)
| thesis_title      = Introduction to a General Theory of Elementary Propositions
| thesis_url        = 
| thesis_year       = 1920
| doctoral_advisor  = Cassius Jackson Keyser
| doctoral_students =
| known_for  = Formulation 1Post correspondence problemCompleteness-proof of Principias propositional calculusPost's inversion formulaPost's latticePost's theorem
}}Emil Leon Post''' (February 11, 1897 – April 21, 1954) was an American mathematician and logician. He is best known for his work in the field that eventually became known as computability theory.

Life
Post was born in Augustów, Suwałki Governorate, Congress Poland, Russian Empire (now Poland) into a Polish-Jewish family that immigrated to New York City in May 1904. His parents were Arnold and Pearl Post.

Post had been interested in astronomy, but at the age of twelve lost his left arm in a car accident. This loss was a significant obstacle to being a professional astronomer, leading to his decision to pursue mathematics rather than astronomy.

Post attended the Townsend Harris High School and continued on to graduate from City College of New York in 1917 with a B.S. in Mathematics.

After completing his Ph.D. in mathematics in 1920 at Columbia University, supervised by Cassius Jackson Keyser, he did a post-doctorate at Princeton University in the 1920–1921 academic year. Post then became a high school mathematics teacher in New York City.

Post married Gertrude Singer in 1929, with whom he had a daughter, Phyllis Post Goodman (1932–1995). Post spent at most three hours a day on research on the advice of his doctor in order to avoid manic attacks, which he had been experiencing since his year at Princeton.

In 1936, he was appointed to the mathematics department at the City College of New York. He died in 1954 of a heart attack following electroshock treatment for depression; he was 57.

Early work
In his doctoral thesis, later shortened and published as "Introduction to a General Theory of Elementary Propositions" (1921), Post proved, among other things, that the propositional calculus of Principia Mathematica was complete: all tautologies are theorems, given the Principia axioms and the rules of substitution and modus ponens. Post also devised truth tables independently of Ludwig Wittgenstein and C. S. Peirce and put them to good mathematical use.  Jean van Heijenoort's well-known source book on mathematical logic (1966) reprinted Post's classic 1921 article setting out these results.

While at Princeton, Post came very close to discovering the incompleteness of Principia Mathematica, which Kurt Gödel proved in 1931. Post initially failed to publish his ideas as he believed he needed a 'complete analysis' for them to be accepted. As Post said in a postcard to Gödel in 1938:

I would have discovered Gödel’s theorem in 1921—if I had been Gödel.

Recursion theory
In 1936, Post developed, independently of Alan Turing, a mathematical model of computation that was  essentially equivalent to the Turing machine model. Intending this as the first of a series of models of equivalent power but increasing complexity, he titled his paper Formulation 1. This model is sometimes called "Post's machine" or a Post–Turing machine, but is not to be confused with Post's tag machines or other special kinds of Post canonical system, a computational model using string rewriting and developed by Post in the 1920s but first published in 1943.  Post's rewrite technique is now ubiquitous in programming language specification and design, and so with Church's lambda-calculus is a salient influence of classical modern logic on practical computing. Post devised a method of 'auxiliary symbols' by which he could canonically represent any Post-generative language, and indeed any computable function or set at all.

Correspondence systems were introduced by Post in 1946 to give simple examples of undecidability. He showed that the Post Correspondence Problem (PCP) of satisfying their constraints is, in general, undecidable. The undecidability of the correspondence problem turned out to be exactly what was needed to obtain undecidability results in the theory of formal languages.

In an influential address to the American Mathematical Society in 1944, he raised the question of the existence of an uncomputable recursively enumerable set whose Turing degree is less than that of the halting problem. This question, which became known as Post's problem, stimulated much research. It was solved in the affirmative in the 1950s by the introduction of the powerful priority method in recursion theory.

Polyadic groups
Post made a fundamental and still-influential contribution to the theory of polyadic, or n-ary, groups in a long paper published in 1940.  His major theorem showed that a polyadic group is the iterated multiplication of elements of a normal subgroup of a group, such that the quotient group is cyclic of order n'' − 1.  He also demonstrated that a polyadic group operation on a set can be expressed in terms of a group operation on the same set.  The paper contains many other important results.

Selected papers
 
 
 
 
 
  Introduces the important concept of many-one reduction.

See also
Arithmetical hierarchy
Functional completeness
List of multiple discoveries
List of pioneers in computer science

Notes

References

Neary, Turlough (2015), "Undecidability in binary tag systems and the post correspondence problem for five pairs of words", International Symposium on Theoretical Aspects of Computer Science, Leibniz International Proceedings in Informatics (LIPIcs), pages 649--661, 2015.

Further reading 
  
Dedicated to Emil Post and contains special material on Post. This includes "Post's Relation to the Cryptology and Cryptographists of his Era: ... Steven Brams, the noted game theorist and political scientist, has remarked to us that the life and legacy of Emil Post represents one aspect of New York intellectual life during the first half of the twentieth century that is very much in need of deeper exploration. The authors hope that this paper serves to further this pursuit". (pp. 842–843)
 
Reprints several papers by Post.

A biographical essay.
 
Much material on Emil Post from his first-hand recollections.

A biographical article.

External links
 Emil Leon Post Papers 1927-1991, American Philosophical Society, Philadelphia, Pennsylvania.
 

1897 births
1954 deaths
People from Augustów
20th-century Polish people
Congress Poland emigrants to the United States
American people of Polish-Jewish descent
20th-century American mathematicians
American amputees
American logicians
Computability theorists
Columbia University alumni
People with bipolar disorder
Townsend Harris High School alumni
Mathematicians from New York (state)
City College of New York faculty